Crown moulding is a form of cornice created out of decorative moulding installed atop an interior wall.  It is also used atop doors, windows, pilasters and cabinets.

Historically made of plaster or wood, modern crown moulding installation may be of a single element, or a build-up of multiple components into a more elaborate whole.

Application
Crown moulding is typically installed at the intersection of walls and ceiling, but may also be used above doors, windows, or cabinets.  Crown treatments made out of wood may be a single piece of trim, or a build-up of multiple components to create a more elaborate look.  The main element, or the only in a plain installation, is a piece of trim that is sculpted on one side and flat on the other, with standard angles forming 90-degrees milled on both its top and bottom edges.  When placed against a wall and ceiling a triangular void is created behind it.  Cutting inside and outside corners requires complex cuts at standard angles, typically done with powered compound miter saws that feature detents at these angles to aid the user.

An alternative method, coping, is a two step process that begins with cutting a simple miter on both mating trim ends, then uses a coping saw to backcut least one of the miters along its profiled edge to provide relief during installation.

Simplified crown installation is possible when using manufactured corner blocks, requiring only simple butt cuts on each end of lengths of trim.  Plastic and foam versions of crown are now available, typically with corner blocks, for easy installation by DIY home improvement enthusiasts.

Angle calculations 

Fitting crown moulding requires a cut at the correct combination of miter angle and bevel angle.  The calculation of these angles is affected by two variables: (1) the spring angle (or crown angle, typically sold in 45° and 38° formats), and (2) the wall angle.

Pre-calculated crown moulding tables or software can be used to facilitate the determination of the correct angles.  Given the spring angle and the wall angle, the formulas used to calculate the miter angle and the bevel angle are:

 Miter angle 
 Bevel angle

See also 
 Baseboard
 Dado rail
 Panelling

External links 
 Online Angle Generator and Crown Molding Installation Tutorials 

Floors
Walls
Woodworking
Architectural elements